National Palace of Arts "Ukraina" or Palace "Ukraina" is one of the main theatre venues for official events along with Palace of Sports in Kyiv, Ukraine. The venue is a state company administered by the State Directory of Affairs. The main concert hall has a capacity of 3,714 people.

History

It was opened in April 1970 as the biggest center of culture and arts. The building was primarily intended to serve as a venue for party congresses and events of the Communist Party of Ukraine, and secondarily as a concert hall. The building was designed by a group of architects P. Zhylytskyi, I. Vayner, under the directorship of the project's author the distinguished architect of Ukrainian SSR Yevhenia Marychenko.

All of the architects were awarded Shevchenko National Prize (1971) for its design and construction. The building is trapezoidal, twenty eight meters tall and consists of over 300 rooms. The exterior of the building, which was remodeled in 1996, is characteristic of the sober and functional Soviet architecture of its time. The interiors and equipment of the lobby as well as artistic rooms of the palace "Ukraine" are designed by the architect I. Karakis.

Although it was finally built on a former market square on Krasnoarmeyskaya street (present vul. Velyka Vasylkivska), it was originally suggested to be built in the place of St. Michael's Golden-Domed Monastery.

On 22 April 1998, the Palace of Ukrayina received the status of National Palace. Director of the building until 2010 was Mykola Mozhovyy.

Major events
The first major event was the 42nd Miss Europe 1997 pageant held on 6 September 1997. 

Usually taking place in the Verkhovna Rada building, on 30 November 1999 the venue hosted presidential inauguration of the newly elected president of Ukraine Leonid Kuchma. Lana Del Rey, Christina Aguilera, Enrique Iglesias, Luciano Pavarotti and Sofia Rotaru are some of the artists that have performed there. 

The arena hosted the 11th Junior Eurovision Song Contest 2013, and also hosted the Kiev Major Dota 2 eSports tournament in April 2017.

References

Bibliography

External links

 Official website 
 History of the building at official website 
 Information about the palace at the State Management of Affairs website

Concert halls in Ukraine
Arts centers in Ukraine
Performing arts centers in Ukraine
Buildings and structures in Kyiv
Pecherskyi District
Event venues established in 1970
Buildings and structures built in the Soviet Union
Culture in Kyiv
Government buildings in Ukraine
Institutions with the title of National in Ukraine